Hunter × Hunter is an anime television series based on the manga series of the same name written and illustrated by Yoshihiro Togashi which aired from 1999 to 2001. The story focuses on a young boy named Gon Freecss, who one day discovers that the father he had always been told was dead is in fact alive and well. He learns that his father, Ging, is a famous "Hunter": an individual who has proven themself an elite member of humanity. Despite the fact that Ging left his son with his relatives in order to pursue his own dreams, Gon becomes determined to follow in his father's footsteps, pass the rigorous "Hunter Examination", and eventually find his father to become a Hunter in his own right.

Hunter × Hunter was produced by Nippon Animation and directed by Kazuhiro Furuhashi. A total of 62 episodes were broadcast on Fuji Television from October 16, 1999 to March 31, 2001. The series has additionally aired on the satellite television station Animax. Marvelous Entertainment released all episodes of the series in Japan on DVD in 13 separate volumes between September 20, 2000 and September 19, 2001.

Viz Media licensed the Hunter × Hunter anime for distribution in the Region 1 market, where it was released across four DVD box-sets. The first set was released on December 9, 2008 and the final was released on December 1, 2009. Starting with the second volume, Viz partnered with Warner Home Video in distributing the DVDs. Hunter × Hunter began airing in the United States on the Funimation Channel in the spring of 2009.

The background music for the Hunter × Hunter anime and the three OVA series was composed by Toshihiko Sahashi.

Episodes

Hunter Exam arc

Zoldyck Family arc

Heavens Arena arc

Yorknew City Arc/Phantom Troupe Arc

References

External links
Hunter × Hunter anime profile at Nippon Animation 

Hunter x Hunter (1997)
1999